(also , , ; literally "rotten pot", although podrida is probably a version of the original word poderida, so it could be translated as "powerful pot") is a Spanish stew, usually made with chickpeas or beans, and assorted meats like pork, beef, bacon, partridge, chicken, ham, sausage, and vegetables such as carrots, leeks, cabbage, potatoes and onions.

The meal is traditionally prepared in a clay pot over several hours. It is eaten as a main course, sometimes as a single dish, and sometimes with ingredients separated (i.e., meats from the rest, or liquids from solids). It is a specialty of the city of Burgos.

The recipe can be found in Opera dell’arte del cucinare by Bartolomeo Scappi, the cook of Pope Pius V, published in 1570. This recipe was translated in Dutch by Antonius Magirus for the Koock-boeck oft Familieren kevken-boeck, first published in Leuven in 1612.

The word was adapted into English as olio, which the Oxford English Dictionary defines as "A spiced meat and vegetable stew of Spanish and Portuguese origin. Hence: any dish containing a great variety of ingredients."

See also 

 Cocido
 List of legume dishes
 List of stews
 Olla
 Pot-au-feu
 Pot-pourri
 Sancocho

References 

Spanish soups and stews
Spanish legume dishes